Parapostenus is a genus of spiders in the family Miturgidae. It was first described in 1923 by Lessert. , it contains only one species, Parapostenus hewitti, found in South Africa and Lesotho.

References

Miturgidae
Monotypic Araneomorphae genera
Spiders of Africa